The Habib Group is a prominent Bangladeshi industrial conglomerate. Founded in Chittagong in 1947, it employs over 20,000 people and has various interests in textiles, aviation, cement, steel, real estate, insurance and banking. It is the parent company of Regent Airways, a Bangladeshi private airline, and Regent Power Limited, a power generating company. the company is also one of the oldest cement manufacturers of Bangladesh.

References

External links
 Corporate information of Habib Group 
 Business Concerns of Habib Group 

Manufacturing companies of Bangladesh
Conglomerate companies of Bangladesh
Companies based in Chittagong
Manufacturing companies established in 1947